Rags to Riches is a 1922 American silent comedy film directed by Wallace Worsley and written by Walter DeLeon and William Nigh. The film stars Wesley Barry, Niles Welch, Ruth Renick, Russell Simpson, Minna Redman, and Richard Tucker. The film was released by Warner Bros. on September 24, 1922.

Plot
Marmaduke Clyde, a wealthy boy in search of adventure, leaves home to join a gang of crooks. He and Dumbbell strike out by themselves and find work on a farm. Dumbbell falls in love with Mary Wilde, but they incur the wrath of the Purist's League delegation, the sheriff, the Clarkes, detectives hired by Mr Clarke, and the gang of crooks intent on kidnapping Marmaduke, Dumbbell, and Mary all meet up together, Dumbbell reveals himself to be Ralph Connor, Secret Service agent, and turns the gang over to the sheriff.

Cast   
Wesley Barry as Marmaduke Clarke
Niles Welch as Dumbbell 
Ruth Renick as Mary Warde
Russell Simpson as The Sheriff
Minna Redman as Sheriff's wife
Richard Tucker as Blackwell Clarke
Eulalie Jensen as Mrs. Blackwell Clarke
Jane Keckley as Marmaduke's Governess
Sam Kaufman as Tony
Dick Sutherland as Bull
James Quinn as Louis 
Snitz Edwards as Purist League member
Aileen Manning as Purist League member

Box office
According to Warner Bros records, the film earned $418,000 domestically and $29,000 foreign.

References

External links

Lobby cards at silenthollywood.com

1922 films
1922 comedy-drama films
Warner Bros. films
Films directed by Wallace Worsley
American silent feature films
American black-and-white films
1920s English-language films
1920s American films
Silent American comedy-drama films